Pierre Cardinal (8 June 1924 – 16 May 1998) was a French screenwriter and director. His sister was author Marie Cardinal. He directed the 1983 mini series Bel Ami.

Filmography

Film 
 1952 : Heart of the Casbah
 1955 : Fantaisie d'un jour

Television 
 1961 : Le rouge et le noir
 1962 : Candide ou l'optimisme
 1965 : La grande peur dans la montagne
 1967 : L'oeuvre
 1968 : La bonifas
 1969 : Le ciel et l'enfer
 1971 : Vipère au poing
 1971 : Sous le soleil de Satan
 1972 : Les fossés de Vincennes
 1975 : Saint-Just et la force des choses
 1978 : 68 dans le monde
 1980 : La vie de Pierre de Coubertin

Series 
 1961 : Elan blanc
 1964 : La route

References

1924 births
1998 deaths
Chevaliers of the Légion d'honneur
French film directors
French film producers
French male screenwriters
20th-century French screenwriters
People from Algiers
20th-century French male writers